Michael Scott Lawrence is an American geneticist best known for his work on mutational signatures. Lawrence is an Assistant Professor of Pathology at the Harvard Medical School, Assistant Geneticist at the Massachusetts General Hospital, and member of the Broad Institute.

Biography
Lawrence earned his B.A. degree in Biochemistry from Brandeis University in 1998 and his Ph.D. degree in Biology from the Massachusetts Institute of Technology in 2005, under the mentorship of David Bartel. He later received his post-doctoral training in David R. Liu's laboratory at the Harvard University from 2005 to 2008. After completion of his post-doctoral training, Lawrence was affiliated with the Cancer Program of the Broad Institute, where he and his colleagues developed the MutSig algorithm, which assesses the mutational significance by correcting for sources of mutational heterogeneity across cancer, including cancer type, mutational spectrum, gene expression, and replication timing. The development of the MutSig algorithm led to the reanalysis of major cancer genome sequencing projects, including The Cancer Genome Atlas, to remove false positives that were present in previous studies. In 2016, Lawrence was appointed as the Assistant Professor of Pathology at the Harvard Medical School and the Assistant Geneticist at the Center for Cancer Research, Massachusetts General Hospital. Since 2017, Lawrence has been named Highly Cited Researcher in the field of Molecular Biology and Genetics by Clarivate.

References 

Year of birth missing (living people)
Living people